The Tour Colombia, called earlier Colombia Oro y Paz is a stage professional cycling race held annually in Colombia since 2018. It is part of UCI America Tour in category 2.1.

Winners

See also
 Vuelta a Colombia
 Vuelta a Colombia Femenina Oro y Paz

References

 
Cycle races in Colombia
UCI America Tour races
Recurring sporting events established in 2018